The Protection from Harassment Act 1997 (c 40) is an Act of the Parliament of the United Kingdom. On introducing the Bill's second reading in the House of Lords, the Lord Chancellor, Lord Mackay of Clashfern, said, "The aim of this Bill is to protect the victims of harassment. It will protect all such victims whatever the source of the harassment—so-called stalking behaviour, racial harassment, or anti-social behaviour by neighbours." Home Office guidance on the Act says "The legislation was always intended to tackle stalking, but the offences were drafted to tackle any form of persistent conduct which causes another person alarm or distress."

Infield and Platford described the Act as "controversial".

Provisions

Section 1
This section prohibits a person from pursuing "a course of conduct" which "amounts to harassment of another" and which "he knows or ought to know amounts to harassment of the other". A person is taken to know that conduct is harassment if "a reasonable person in possession of the same information would think the course of conduct amounted to harassment of the other".

The Protection of Freedoms Act 2012 inserted the offence of stalking in relation to this section and is defined to include things like monitoring a person online, contacting a person, loitering in a public or private place, interfering with property or spying/watching a person.

Subsection 1(1A) 
Subsection 1(1A) was inserted by section 125(2)(a) of the Serious Organised Crime and Police Act 2005. It prohibits a person from pursuing a course of conduct "which involves harassment of two or more persons" with the intention of persuading any person (not necessarily one of the persons harassed) to do or refrain from doing something they are lawfully entitled to do or not do.

According to Baroness Scotland of Ashall, promoting the Bill in the House of Lords, this provision and the associated provisions of section 3A were intended to strengthen "the protection afforded to the bioscience industry, and those who work in it" including by "making it an offence to protest outside a person's home in a way that causes harassment, alarm or distress to the residents of that home."

Section 2
This section creates the offence of harassment, which is to pursue "a course of conduct" in breach of section 1 of the Act. It is a summary offence. A person guilty of this offence is liable on conviction to imprisonment for a term not exceeding six months, or a to fine not exceeding level 5 on the standard scale, or to both.

Section 2(3) was repealed by section 107 of, and Schedule 8 to, the Police Reform Act 2002.

Section 2A
The Protection from Harassment Act 1997 did not originally define "stalking" or formally proscribe it.

This section creates a specific offence of stalking. It followed a commitment given by the Prime Minister, David Cameron, on 8 March 2012 (International Women's Day) to remedy perceived deficiencies in the Act.

The offence created by this section is a summary offence and a person guilty of it is liable on conviction to imprisonment for a term not exceeding 51 weeks, or to a fine not exceeding level 5 on the standard scale, or to both.

This section was inserted by section 111(1) of the Protection of Freedoms Act 2012.

Section 2B
This section, which confers, on justices of the peace, a power to issue a search warrant to allow constables to enter and search premises for evidence of offences under section 2A, was inserted by section 112 of the Protection of Freedoms Act 2012.

Section 3
This section provides for a claim in civil proceedings (creating a statutory tort) by anyone who is or who may be a victim of conduct falling within section 1. It provides for damages for anxiety caused by the harassment and any financial loss it causes, as well as providing for an injunction to restrain the defendant from conduct amounting to harassment. Where any person against whom an injunction has been granted under this section does "without reasonable excuse" anything prohibited by that injunction, section 3(6) of the Act makes that person guilty of an offence.

Offences under section 3(6) are triable either way. A person guilty of an offence under section 3(6) is liable, on conviction on indictment, to imprisonment for a term not exceeding five years, or to a fine, or to both, or, on summary conviction, to imprisonment for a term not exceeding six months, or to a fine not exceeding the statutory maximum, or to both.

Section 3A
This section provides similar injunction provisions to those in section 3, but in this case applying to the offence created by section 1(1A). However, in addition to it allowing the person who is the victim or who may be the victim of the conduct in question to seek an injunction, it also gives a similar right to someone whose behaviour the harassment is intended to influence.

Section 3A was inserted by section 125(5) of the Serious Organised Crime and Police Act 2005.

Section 4
This section creates the offence of "putting people in fear of violence" where a person "causes another to fear, on at least two occasions, that violence will be used against him" provided "he knows or ought to know that his course of conduct will cause the other so to fear on each of those occasions".

There are a number of defences. These include showing that the course of conduct is pursued for the "purpose of preventing or detecting crime" or "reasonable for the protection of himself or another or for the protection of his or another’s property."

In 2001, David Ormerod said that this section "could have been drafted more clearly all round".

Offences under section 4 are triable either way. A person guilty of an offence under section 4 is liable, on conviction on indictment, to imprisonment for a term not exceeding five years, or to a fine, or to both, or, on summary conviction, to imprisonment for a term not exceeding six months, or to a fine not exceeding the statutory maximum, or to both.

Section 4A
This section creates the offence of stalking involving fear of violence or serious alarm or distress. This requires there to be a person A whose "course of conduct ... amounts to stalking" and a person B who is affected by the course of conduct. The course of conduct must either cause B "to fear, on at least two occasions, that violence will be used against B" or causes B "serious alarm or distress which has a substantial adverse effect on B's usual day-to-day activities".

Offences under section 4A are triable either way. A person guilty of an offence under section 4A is liable, on conviction on indictment, to imprisonment for a term not exceeding five years, or to a fine, or to both, or, on summary conviction, to imprisonment for a term not exceeding twelve months, or to a fine not exceeding the statutory maximum, or to both.

This section was inserted by section 111(2) of the Protection of Freedoms Act 2012. The stalking element is defined as include acts like monitoring a person online, contacting a person, loitering in a public or private place, interfering with property or spying/watching a person.

Section 5
This section gives a court dealing with a person convicted of an offence under sections 2 (harassment) or 4 (putting in fear of violence) of the Act the power to make a restraining order for the purpose of protecting "the victim of the offence" or "any other person mentioned in the order".

Offences under section 5 are triable either way. A person guilty of an offence under section 5 is liable, on conviction on indictment, to imprisonment for a term not exceeding five years, or to a fine, or to both, or, on summary conviction, to imprisonment for a term not exceeding six months, or to a fine not exceeding the statutory maximum, or to both.

This section has effect in relation to a person convicted of an offence under section 32 of the Crime and Disorder Act 1998 as if the reference in subsection (1) of this section to an offence under section 2 or 4 included a reference to an offence under the said section 32.

Section 5(3A) was inserted by section 12(2) of the Domestic Violence, Crime and Victims Act 2004.

Section 5(4A) was inserted by section 12(3) of the Domestic Violence, Crime and Victims Act 2004.

Section 5(7) was inserted by section 12(4) of the Domestic Violence, Crime and Victims Act 2004.

Section 5A
This section provides for a court to impose a restraining order on someone who has been acquitted of an offence, if the court considers it necessary "to protect a person from harassment by the defendant".
This section was inserted by section 12(5) of the Domestic Violence, Crime and Victims Act 2004.

Section 7
This is the interpretation section. "Harassing" is defined (non-exclusively) as including "alarming" or "causing distress".

Section 7(3) was substituted by section 125(7)(a) of the Serious Organised Crime and Police Act 2005. It now provides that a "course of conduct" requires either conduct on at least two occasions in relation to one person, or, where the harassment is alleged against two or more occasions, conduct in relation to at least one occasion in relation to each person.

Section 7(3A) was inserted by section 44(1) of the Criminal Justice and Police Act 2001.

Section 7(5) was inserted by section 125(7)(b) of the Serious Organised 
Crime and Police Act 2005.

Section 8
Section 8 creates a civil action for harassment applying in Scotland only (sections 1-7 apply only in England and Wales).

Section 8A
This section was inserted by section 1(2) of the Domestic Abuse (Scotland) Act 2011 (asp 13).

Section 15
The Protection from Harassment Act 1997 (Commencement) (No. 1) Order 1997 (SI 1997/1418) (C 52) was made under section 15(1).

The following orders were made under section 15(2):
The Protection from Harassment Act 1997 (Commencement) (No. 2) Order 1997 (SI 1997/1498) (C 58)
The Protection from Harassment Act 1997 (Commencement No. 3) Order 1998 (SI 1998/1902) (C 42)

Racially or religiously aggravated harassment 
Section 32 of the Crime and Disorder Act 1998 now provides that where a person commits an offence under section 2 or 4 of the Protection from Harassment Act which is "racially or religiously aggravated" within the meaning of section 28 of the Crime and Disorder Act 1998 (as amended by the Anti-terrorism, Crime and Security Act 2001) he is guilty of an offence triable either way.

A person convicted on indictment of an offence falling within section 32(1)(a) of the 1998 Act (the racially or religiously aggravated version of the offence under section 2 of the Protection from Harassment Act 1997) is liable to imprisonment for a term not exceeding two years or to a fine, or to both. A person convicted of indictment of an offence falling within section 32(1)(b) of the 1998 Act (the racially or religiously aggravated version of the offence under section 4 of the Protection from Harassment Act 1997) is liable to imprisonment for a term not exceeding seven years or to a fine, or to both.

Definition
In England and Wales, the Act now creates offences of harassment, stalking, putting people in fear of violence, stalking involving fear of violence or serious alarm or distress, breach of injunction and breach of restraining order.

Someone who believes they are the victim of harassment falling within section 1 of the Act may (either instead of or in addition to a criminal prosecution) elect to pursue a civil remedy for damages for anxiety or for financial loss arising from harassment: section 3(2). Section 3 creates a statutory tort based on the same acts as the criminal offence. An example of this tort in action appears in Green v DB Group Services (UK) Ltd [2006] EWHC 1898 QB (1 August 2006). which was a case of severe and prolonged workplace bullying resulting in serious illness of the claimant.

If a claimant elects to pursue the section 3 civil law remedy, the standard of proof which needs to be shown is the common law standard of proof on "the balance of probabilities" (more likely than not) rather than the standard for criminal law which is proof beyond reasonable doubt.

The editor of "Archbold" notes the Act does not attempt to define "harassment". In Thomas v News Group Newspapers and Another (2001), Lord Philips MR said: "'Harassment' is, however, a word which has a meaning which is generally understood. It describes conduct targeted at an individual which is calculated to produce the consequences described in section 7 and which is oppressive and unreasonable."

Section 7(2) of the Act provides that, for the purpose of the interpretation of sections 1 to 5A, references to harassing a person include alarming the person or causing the person distress.

Section 5 of the Act gives the court in criminal cases a power to grant restraining orders and section 5A, introduced by the Domestic Violence, Crime and Victims Act 2004, extends this power to cases where the defendant was acquitted, if the court "considers it necessary to do so to protect a person from harassment by the defendant.". The power to grant restraining orders was characterised as "the most important aspect of the Act" by practitioners interviewed in a Home Office research study (2000) into the effectiveness of the Act. The power to grant restraining orders is separate from and additional to the ability of claimants to seek injunctions in civil actions brought under section 3 of the Act. However, in each case the penalties for breach of a restraining order or an injunction are similar: on conviction on indictment, to imprisonment for a term not exceeding five years, or a fine, or both, or on summary conviction, to imprisonment for a term not exceeding six months, or a fine not exceeding the statutory maximum, or both.

The summary offences of harassment "cast the net too wide". The offence created by section 2 is "broad and ill-defined". Its scope is "quite enormous". It might well violate Articles 10 and 11 of the Convention for the Protection of Human Rights and Fundamental Freedoms (in addition to Article 7 mentioned below).

Course of conduct
Section 7(3) of the Act provides that a course of conduct must involve conduct on at least two occasions. (Originally these occasions needed to involve the same person, but the Act was amended by the Serious Organised Crime and Police Act 2005 so that "pursuing a course of conduct" could mean approaching two people just once.)

In Wainwright v. Home Office (2003), Lord Hoffmann said "The requirement of a course of conduct shows that Parliament was conscious that it might not be in the public interest to allow the law to be set in motion for one boorish incident."

The Act contains no definition of "course of conduct" beyond the provisions of sections 7(3) and (4). Case law has established that "merely because there are two incidents between the same parties, this will not inevitably give rise to a course of conduct" and "the requirement of a nexus between the incidents appears an eminently sensible way in which to limit the potentially immense reach of the offence of harassment." In 2003, David Ormerod said that the "course of conduct" element defies definition.

Mens rea
Constructive knowledge or actual knowledge is an element of the offences under sections 2, 2A, 4 and 4A; that is, the prosecution has to show that the defendant "knows or ought to know" that the course of conduct complained of has the prescribed effects on the person at whom it is directed. The test of "ought to know" is based on what "a reasonable person in possession of the same information" would think about the course of conduct in question. Section 4(2) "has an unusual type of mens rea with objective and subjective components." The justification for the imposition of liability based on constructive knowledge is the difficulty which might exist of proving mens rea on the part of "stalkers" who often suffer from mental or personality disorders.

Employers' liability
Employers have vicarious liability for harassment by their employees under section 3 of the Protection from Harassment Act 1997 (see Majrowski v Guy's and St Thomas' NHS Trust). For employees this may provide an easier route to compensation than claims based on discrimination legislation or personal injury claims for stress at work, as the elements of harassment are likely to be easier to prove, the statutory defence is not available to the employer, and it may be easier to establish a claim for compensation. Also as the claim can be made in either the High Court or the County Court costs may be recoverable by the successful party, subject to relevant court rules and limits. The Small claims track in the United Kingdom can be used for such claims as well.

Other cases are Lister v Hesley Hall [2002] 1 AC 215, Thomas v News Group Newspapers [2001] EWCA 1233, Green v DB Group [2006] EWHC 1899, Rayment v MOD High Court 18 February 2010, Singh v Bhakar, Nottingham County Court, 24 July 2006, Conn v Sunderland [2007] EWCA 1492, Allen v South Southwark Court of Appeal 12 November 2008, Ferguson v British Gas [2009] EWCA 46, Ferguson v British Gas [2009] EWCA 46, Mullens v Accenture, 13 July 2010, Dowson v Chief Constable of Northumbria Police: 2, 20 October 2010.

Number of prosecutions
The Bill for this Act said that it was expected to result in about two hundred prosecutions a year. In 1998, there were nearly six thousand prosecutions. A written question, raised by a Member of Parliament in 2008 and relating to prosecutions under section 2 from the date of the Act to 2006, showed the numbers of persons proceeded against under section 2 remained fairly steady during the period (5,540 in 1999 of whom 2,753 were found guilty, 5,446 in 2006 of whom 3,768 were found guilty). A 2011 written question requesting information about prosecutions under section 2 during the period 2006-2009 showed 5,006 persons proceeded against during 2006-7 of whom 3,543 were found guilty, 4,940 proceeded against during 2007-8 of whom 3,650 were found guilty and 4,865 proceeded against during 2008-9 of whom 3,892 were found guilty.

Northern Ireland
The Protection from Harassment (Northern Ireland) Order 1997 (SI 1997/1180) (NI 9) was made under paragraph 1 of Schedule 1 to the Northern Ireland Act 1974 (as modified by section 13 of this Act) only for purposes corresponding to those of sections 1 to 7 and 12 of this Act.

Scotland
In Scotland the Act works differently. Civil remedies include damages, interdict and non-harassment orders backed by powers of arrest. Any person who is in breach of a non-harassment order made under section 8 is guilty of an offence and liable, on conviction on indictment, to imprisonment for a term not exceeding five years, or to a fine, or to both, and, on summary conviction, to imprisonment for a period not exceeding six months, or to a fine not exceeding the statutory maximum, or to both. A breach of a non-harassment order is not otherwise punishable.

Some Scots lawyers are of the view that there was no need for this Act to extend to Scotland because the law of Scotland already dealt satisfactorily with harassment and contained no relevant lacuna corresponding to any which existed in English law.

History
The Act resulted from the efforts of Evonne Leonora Von Heussen. A stalking victim herself, she launched the National Association for Victims of Stalking and Harassment (NASH) in 1993, when her then teen-age daughter was stalked by a dangerous character who was known to carry a knife. After Von Heussen found that she could get no help from the police, lawyers, or her local Member of Parliament she began researching anti-stalking laws in other countries.  She opened a help line on which she eventually took tens of thousands of calls. She pursued each call with each victim's MP, and attracted a large amount of media attention.  After several years of effort she persuaded the Home Office under Prime Minister John Major to take the issue on as a matter of government policy. She wrote the first draft of the Act and worked closely with ministers and senior civil servants in the Home Office and the Lord Chancellor's Department as the final version took shape.  She advised ministers from her seat in the Under Gallery, on the floor of the House of Commons, during the Second Reading Debate.  After Royal Assent she worked with Home Office and Lord Chancellor's Department in training judges, lawyers, other court personnel, police and voluntary organizations in the use of the Act.  She received the MBE in the Queen's Birthday Honours List (1997) for her efforts. She also worked as a consultant on a number of court cases involving stalking and harassment.

The Protection from Harassment Act 1997 was preceded by the Stalking Bill.

Criticism
At the time of the Act's passing, some legal commentators were critical of it. Andrew Simester, a professor of law at King's College, London, believed it to be "unimpressive" and "hasty", and the result of political agitation; he contended that it "might well violate Article 7 of the Convention for the Protection of Human Rights and Fundamental Freedoms".

Similarly, University College London law professor David Ormerod opined that the drafting of the Act had been "deficient", and that there was an "unseemly rush to get the Bill for this Act through all of its stages in Parliament".

Cambridge University fellow Peter Glazebrook simply referred to it as "deplorably vague".

In a publication evaluating the effectiveness of the Act, Jessica Harris wrote that some magistrates felt "criminalising harassment cases might lead to unfounded accusations from complainants who are mistaken about another’s behaviour or are even vindictive. Prosecutors accepted this point and agreed that they had to be on the lookout for what the police sometimes termed paranoid woman syndrome, where the putative victim read more into another's behaviour than was perhaps warranted." However, "they agreed that the difficulties in pursuing harassment cases were no greater than other kinds of case – such as domestic violence – where the parties are often well known to each other."

In February 2012, Elfyn Llwyd, chairing an Independent Parliamentary Inquiry into reform of stalking law, said the Act was "not an effective tool against stalking". "[T]oo many perpetrators were falling through the net." The "attitudes of many working in the criminal justice system and society towards stalking remain in the dark ages."

Commentators such as George Monbiot have voiced the concern that the amended Act effectively "allows the police to ban any campaign they please", and that it has been used to prosecute peaceful protestors. Journalist Neil Addison believed that the Act was being misused and suggested it be amended so as to decriminalise harassment (but not breach of a court order prohibiting harassment). He said that if the Act was not amended, there would be "a clear danger that it could come to be seen as an oppressive piece of legislation".

Praise
In February 2012, Elfyn Llwyd MP, chairing an Independent Parliamentary Inquiry into reform of stalking law, said the Act was a "landmark piece of legislation".

The Act "is an effective weapon in the armoury of the victim of nuisance creditors." It is "a versatile and wide-ranging statute" and "one of the most flexible pieces of legislation of recent years."
 
This Act was initially "doing its job quite happily". Infield and Platford said that they did not agree with claims that this Act is a breach of human rights.

"Prevention of harassment" notices 
Following the passage of the Act, police forces started to issue "prevention of harassment" notices, also known as "Police Information Notices" (PINs), to people against whom claims of harassment had been made. They are believed to have been created by police forces as a way of preventing people accused of harassment from claiming ignorance that their alleged behavior was undesired and thus avoiding successful prosecution under the Act due to lack of mens rea. Their use has been the subject of controversy, with some describing the notices as "unnecessarily menacing and accusatorial".

In November 2011, whilst Theresa May was Home Secretary, the Home Office published a consultation on stalking which said: "We recognise that there are concerns around the process by which these notices are issued. Some argue that those issued with a Police Information Notice are not given a fair hearing. Equally we are aware that some consider Police Information Notices to lack teeth and that they give victims a false sense of security."

In 2014, the Commons Select Committee of Privileges investigated the issuing in 2012 of a PIN against an MP for statements made in Parliament. Their findings led the police to withdraw the notice.

In 2015, the issuing of a PIN against a British journalist raised concerns about civil liberties and press freedom, creating demands for reform of the process.

Because a PIN has no statutory basis and therefore no legal effect, there is no right of appeal against it, although a complaint can be made to the issuing police force.

See also
Employment discrimination law in the United Kingdom
Harassment in the United Kingdom
Sexual harassment
United Kingdom labour law
United Kingdom employment equality law
Workplace harassment

References

General
Finch, Emily. The Criminalisation of Stalking. Cavendish. London. 2001.
Lawson-Cruttenden, Timothy; Addison, Neil. Blackstone's Guide to the Protection from Harassment Act 1997. Blackstone Press Limited. 1997.
Liberali, Benedetta. Il reato di atti persecutori. Profili costituzionali, applicativi e comparati. FrancoAngeli, Milano. 2012.

Further reading
Philip Johnston. "Would Dante have been guilty of Harassment?" in Bad Laws. Hachette. 2010.
Parliamentary briefing paper https://researchbriefings.files.parliament.uk/documents/SN06648/SN06648.pdf

External links

 Neighbours From Hell in Britain: Harassment from your Neighbour
Weaver v. NATHFE - Race Discrimination Case
A Flight into the Cuckoo's Nest A comprehensive account of the Weaver case

 Edward Countryman, The Guardian, 7 January 2009, Those behind the harassment law did not want it to stifle protest
 Home Office Research Study 203 An evaluation of the use and effectiveness of the Protection from Harassment Act 1997
 Harassment : French Theory by EchelleSR - see more on Mediapart.fr]

United Kingdom Acts of Parliament 1997
Harassment
Stalking